Himachal Pradesh Public Works Department, commonly abbreviated as HPPWD, is a department of Government of Himachal Pradesh entrusted with the responsibility of planning, construction and maintenance of roads, bridges, ropeways and government buildings in Himachal Pradesh state.

References

State agencies of Himachal Pradesh
State Public Works Departments of India